"Before the Next Teardrop Falls" is an American country and pop song written by Vivian Keith and Ben Peters, and most famously recorded by Freddy Fender. His version was a major crossover success in 1975, reaching number one on the Billboard pop and country charts.

Song history
The song was written in 1967 and had been recorded more than two dozen times. It had achieved modest success in versions by various performers; the original version by Duane Dee reached #44 on the Billboard country chart in early 1968, and Linda Martell sent her version to #33 in early 1970. Jerry Lee Lewis recorded a version of it on his 1969 album, Another Place Another Time.

In 1974, record producer Huey P. Meaux approached Fender about overdubbing vocals for an instrumental track. Fender agreed, performing the song bilingual style—singing the first half of the song in English, then repeating it in Spanish.

"The recording only took a few minutes," Fender told an interviewer. "I was glad to get it over with and I thought that would be the last of it."

However, "Before the Next Teardrop Falls" immediately took off in popularity when released to country radio in January 1975. The song ascended to #1 on the Billboard Hot Country Singles chart in March, spending two weeks atop the chart. Thereafter, the song caught on just as strongly at Top 40 radio stations and it was not long before Fender had a #1 Billboard Hot 100 hit as well. Billboard ranked it as the No. 4 song of 1975.

As originally composed, it is in 32-bar form (Fender's bilingual recording stretches the piece to 48 bars).

A showcase of Fender's tenor and Meaux's Tex-Mex musical styling, "Before the Next Teardrop Falls" jump-started his career. (Fender's career had stalled in 1960 after his arrest on drug charges.) In the months and years that followed, Fender recorded several bilingual standards which became major hits, most notably "Secret Love".

Fender also recorded a version fully in Spanish, entitled "Estaré contigo cuando triste estés" (literally "I will be with you when you are sad"). The Spanish-language second verse in the English version is the first verse of the fully Spanish version.

Successes
"Before The Next Teardrop Falls" was certified gold for sales of 1 million units by the Recording Industry Association of America. The song also won the Single of the Year award from the Country Music Association in 1975, and was conducive to Fender also winning that year's Album of the Year and Male Vocalist of the Year awards.

The song was used in the movie The Three Burials of Melquiades Estrada (2005).

1975 country-pop "half-dozen"
"Before the Next Teardrop Falls" was one of six songs released in 1975 that topped both the Billboard Hot 100 and Billboard Hot Country Singles charts. The others were "(Hey Won't You Play) Another Somebody Done Somebody Wrong Song" by B.J. Thomas; "Rhinestone Cowboy" by Glen Campbell; "Thank God I'm a Country Boy" and the two-sided hit "I'm Sorry"/"Calypso" by John Denver; and "Convoy" by C.W. McCall.

Covers
 Loretta Lynn recorded the song for her album Home in 1975.
 Dolly Parton later recorded the song, including it on her 1996 covers album Treasures; Parton's version featured vocals by David Hidalgo, who sang the Spanish lyrics.
 Gene Stuart recorded a version that went to number 3 in the IRMA Irish charts in 1969.

Chart performance

Weekly charts

Year-end charts

All-time charts

References

1967 songs
Dot Records singles
Songs written by Ben Peters
1975 debut singles
Freddy Fender songs
Linda Martell songs
Jerry Lee Lewis songs
Billboard Hot 100 number-one singles
Cashbox number-one singles
Song recordings produced by Huey P. Meaux